The El Abra mine is a large copper mine located in northern Chile in the El Loa province. It is operated by Freeport-McMoRan, who owns a 51% stake in the mine, with the remainder owned by Codelco.

References 

Copper mines in Chile
Freeport-McMoRan mines